†Partula salifera was a species of air-breathing tropical land snail, a terrestrial pulmonate gastropod mollusk in the family Partulidae. This species was previously found in Northern Mariana Islands and possibly Guam. It is now extinct.

References

 Smith, B. 2000.  Partula salifera.   2006 IUCN Red List of Threatened Species.   Downloaded on 7 August 2007.

Partula (gastropod)
Extinct gastropods
Taxonomy articles created by Polbot